14th NYFCO Awards
December 7, 2014

Best Film:
Boyhood 

The 14th New York Film Critics Online Awards, honoring the best in filmmaking in 2014, were given on December 7, 2014.

Winners
Best Film:
Boyhood
Best Director:
Richard Linklater – Boyhood
Best Actor:
Eddie Redmayne – The Theory of Everything
Best Actress:
Marion Cotillard – Two Days, One Night
Best Supporting Actor:
J.K. Simmons – Whiplash
Best Supporting Actress:
Patricia Arquette – Boyhood
Best Screenplay:
Birdman or (The Unexpected Virtue of Ignorance) – Amando Bo, Alexander Dinelaris, Nicolas Giacobone, and Alejandro G. Inarritu
Best Animated Film:
The Lego Movie
Best Documentary Film:
Life Itself
Best Ensemble Cast:
Birdman or (The Unexpected Virtue of Ignorance)
Best Cinematography:
Birdman or (The Unexpected Virtue of Ignorance) – Emmanuel Lubezki
Best Debut Director:
Dan Gilroy – Nightcrawler
Best Film Music or Score:
Get On Up – Thomas Newman
Best Foreign Language Film:
Two Days, One Night • Belgium
Breakthrough Performer:
Jack O'Connell – Unbroken, Starred Up
Top Ten Pictures:
 Birdman or (The Unexpected Virtue of Ignorance)
 Boyhood
 Guardians of the Galaxy
 The Imitation Game
 A Most Violent Year
 Mr. Turner
 Selma
 The Theory of Everything
 Under the Skin
 Whiplash

References

New York Film Critics Online Awards
2014 film awards
2014 in American cinema